Dennis Stanley Williams (15 November 1936 – 18 September 2013) was an English first-class cricketer and British Army officer. Williams served in the Royal Artillery for 34 years, during which time he played first-class cricket for the Combined Services cricket team.

Military career
Williams graduated from the Royal Military Academy Sandhurst in August 1957, entering into the Royal Artillery as a second lieutenant. He was promoted to the rank of lieutenant in August 1959, with promotion to captain coming in August 1963. He became a major in December 1968. In 1975, he gained the rank of lieutenant colonel, with promotion to colonel in June 1983. He gained his final promotion to brigadier in December 1987, with seniority to June 1987. He retired from military service in November 1991.

First-class cricket
Williams made his debut in minor counties cricket for Berkshire in 1958, making two appearances in the Minor Counties Championship. He made his debut in first-class cricket in 1959 when he was selected to play for the Combined Services cricket team against Warwickshire at Birmingham. He played first-class cricket for the Combined Services until 1964, making a total of eight first-class appearances. Williams scored a total of 225 runs at an average of 16.07, with a high score of 82.

References

External links

1936 births
2013 deaths
People from Sutton, London
Graduates of the Royal Military Academy Sandhurst
Royal Artillery officers
English cricketers
Berkshire cricketers
Combined Services cricketers
British Army brigadiers
Military personnel from London